Aerolíneas Argentinas was established by the Argentine government in .  Shortly after the carrier started revenue flights in  it experienced its first deadly accident, when a Douglas C-47A crashed en route to Buenos Aires from Mar del Plata, killing 17 of the 18 occupants.

Following is a list of accidents and incidents experienced by Aerolíneas Argentinas. According to the Aviation Safety Network,  there have been 12 deadly accidents, totalling 335 fatalities. The deadliest accident occurred in 1961, with a death toll of 67. The latest accident involving fatalities took place in 1970. The company ranks among the safest airlines in the world.

Aerolíneas Argentinas has written off 28 aircraft; nine Douglas C-47As, four Avro 748s, three Comet 4s, two Boeing 737s, two Douglas DC-6s, two Convair CV-240s, two Fokker F-28s, one Boeing 707, one Douglas DC-4, one Douglas C-54, and one McDonnell Douglas MD-88.

List

Footnotes

Notes

References 

 
Lists of aviation accidents and incidents